Zeritis is a genus of butterflies in the family Lycaenidae. The species of this genus are found in the Afrotropical realm.

Species
The genus includes the following species:

Zeritis aurivillii  Schultze, 1908
Zeritis fontainei  Stempffer, 1956
Zeritis krystyna  D'Abrera, 1980
Zeritis neriene  Boisduval, [1836]
Zeritis pulcherrima  Aurivillius, 1923
Zeritis sorhagenii (Dewitz, 1879)

External links
 "Zeritis Boisduval, [1836]" at Markku Savela's Lepidoptera and Some Other Life Forms

Aphnaeinae
Lycaenidae genera
Taxa named by Jean Baptiste Boisduval